Jesse Myles (September 28, 1960 – March 7, 2010) was an American football running back. He played for the Denver Broncos from 1983 to 1984.

He died on March 7, 2010, in Gray, Louisiana at age 49.

References

1960 births
2010 deaths
American football running backs
LSU Tigers football players
Denver Broncos players